Mohamed Duaij  (born 24 July 1981) is a Bahraini professional footballer who plays as a defender for Al-Riffa.

References

External links
 
 

1981 births
Living people
Bahraini footballers
Bahrain international footballers
Association football defenders
2015 AFC Asian Cup players
Footballers at the 2010 Asian Games
Sportspeople from Manama
Asian Games competitors for Bahrain